Cyril Emanuel King (April 7, 1921 – January 2, 1978) was an American politician who served as the second elected Governor of the United States Virgin Islands from 1975 until his death in 1978.

He also briefly served as acting governor in 1969, following the resignation of Governor Ralph M. Paiewonsky.

Early life
King was born in Frederiksted on the island of Saint Croix, where he lived during his formative years. During World War II, he served in the 873rd Port Company in Hawaii.

After the completion of his service, he attended the American University, where he earned a public administration degree.

Political career
Starting in 1949, King worked for Minnesota senator Hubert Humphrey, as the first black member of staff of the U.S. Senate. He rose through the ranks of the office, eventually becoming chief of staff. He returned to the islands in 1951 as an appointed government secretary for John F. Kennedy .

To support his election for governor in 1970 and challenge the Democratic Party in the Virgin Islands, he developed the Independent Citizens Movement. Even though his 1970 campaign was unsuccessful, he ran again in 1974 and won, becoming the second governor of the Virgin Islands. At the time of his death, he had been planning to run for a second term.

Legacy
A Virgin Islands' statute puts aside April 7, King's birthday, as Cyril Emmanuel King Day.

In 1984, the Harry S. Truman Airport on St. Thomas was renamed Cyril E. King Airport by the Virgin Islands Legislature.

References

External links

 Profiles of Outstanding Virgin Islanders  (includes link to photo)

|-

1921 births
1978 deaths
20th-century African-American people
African-American people in United States Virgin Island politics
American University alumni
Democratic Party governors of the United States Virgin Islands
Governors of the United States Virgin Islands
United States Army personnel of World War II
United States Virgin Islands military personnel